Oleksandr Ivanyshyn (born 23 September 1974) is a Ukrainian bobsledder. He competed in the two man and the four man events at the 2002 Winter Olympics.

References

1974 births
Living people
Ukrainian male bobsledders
Olympic bobsledders of Ukraine
Bobsledders at the 2002 Winter Olympics
Place of birth missing (living people)